is a Japanese manga series written and illustrated by Hidekichi Matsumoto, began serialization in Kodansha's Nakayoshi magazine from December 2010. The final chapter was published in the magazine's January 2017 issue. An anime adaptation by Pierrot+ aired in Japan between July and September 2014.

Plot
Taking place at Aogiri Academy, the series follows a group of female high school students and their daily lives in a survival game club.

Characters

A transfer student who is coerced into joining the Survival Game Club by Miou. Gentle and kind on the surface, a different aspect appears when she feels herself wronged or threatened, showing a vicious and vengeful side. She uses a Beretta 92FS. 

The club president and a third year student who comes from a rich family. Her beauty and personality makes her well respected and loved by most of the students in the school. Due to being held back in school for a year (attributed to a lack of credits in the manga and misconduct in the anime), she is old enough to wield airsoft guns the other members are too young to use. She dual wields two Desert Eagles. 

A well-endowed second year student who works part time as a gravure idol. A running joke is the fact that out of all the members of the team, she is usually the first one eliminated. She uses an M4A1 Carbine with a Close Quarters Battle Receiver and an XPS variant of an EOTech holographic sight which she keeps in a case as opposed to holsters like the rest of the club. 

A first year student who hides a fearsome aura behind her cute demeanor. Initially doting on Miou, she falls in love with Momoka instead after developing a masochistic taste for her violent punishments. She dual wields two Glock 26C (note that while the semi-auto Glock 26 is a real firearm, the 26C is a full auto, airsoft exclusive variant, which is manufactured by the companies KWA, KSC, and WE-Tech).

A first year student in Momoka's class and the club's treasurer, who joined purely because of cosplay (as airsoft is partly about appearances). She is shown to be able to change clothing incredibly quick and often wears ridiculous ghillies. She is a genius with an IQ of 160, and is consistently one of the top students in her class. She dual wields two Mac-11s.

A platypus who is the club's mascot and often hangs around at Momoka's house.

Momoka's mother, who has some dubious fetishes. She is shown to carry a Smith & Wesson Model 500 with an Aimpoint T1 red dot sight and is the most skilled gunfighter in the series.

The Survival Game Club's advisor, who often brings about bad luck wherever she goes.

The student council president who is often bewildered by Miou's antics, though appears to be developing a crush on her.

An overweight otaku who becomes an admirer of Momoka and occasionally gets involved in the groups antics.

Media

Manga
The series, written by Hidekichi Matsumoto, was serialized in Kodansha's Nakayoshi magazine from December 2010 to December 2016 and compiled in thirteen tankōbon volumes.

Anime
An anime adaptation by Pierrot+, directed by Masahiko Ōta and written by Takashi Aoshima, aired in Japan between July 6, 2014 and September 21, 2014 and was simulcast by Crunchyroll. A pre-airing of the first episode was streamed on Niconico on June 28, 2014. Each Blu-ray Disc volume includes an original video animation episode. The anime has been licensed by Sentai Filmworks.

Episode list

OVA episodes

References

External links
Official anime website 

Airsoft
Anime series based on manga
Comedy anime and manga
Japanese LGBT-related animated television series
Kodansha manga
Sentai Filmworks
Shōjo manga
Slice of life anime and manga
Sports anime and manga
Studio Signpost
Tokyo MX original programming